Vangelis Chosadas (born 17 February 1961) is a retired Greek football goalkeeper and later manager.

References

1961 births
Living people
Greek footballers
Fokikos A.C. players
Panathinaikos F.C. players
Ilisiakos F.C. players
OFI Crete F.C. players
Xanthi F.C. players
Ethnikos Asteras F.C. players
Super League Greece players
Greek football managers
Rodos F.C. managers
GAS Ialysos 1948 F.C. managers
Association football goalkeepers
People from Amfissa
Footballers from Central Greece